Brestač is a village in Serbia. It is situated in the Pećinci municipality, in the Srem District, Vojvodina province. The village has a Serb ethnic majority and its population numbering 1,066 people (2002 census).

Features
Brestač contains three small stores. In the center of the village, there are two stores, a school (grades K-4), a church, a post office, and a small concert hall.

See also
List of places in Serbia
List of cities, towns and villages in Vojvodina

Populated places in Syrmia
Populated places in Srem District
Pećinci